Koorman is a 2022 Indian Tamil-language action thriller film written and directed by Bryan B. George and produced by MK Entertainment. The film stars Rajaji and Janani in the lead roles. The film's music is composed by Tony Britto, with cinematography handled by Shakthi Aravind and editing done by S. Devaraj. The film released in theatres on 11 February 2022.

Plot
Danasekar lives off grid in a secluded farm house with his servant Murugan and his pet dog Subu. He also hallucinates his lover Stella and happens to be an Ex Policeman with a traumatic past. He has a special ability to read the minds of people which is used by his Ex Boss Raghuram to solve complex cases with Danasekars help unofficially.
One such case happens to be the rape and murder of a young girl & the killer Naushad is handed over to Dana for interrogation. 

During his intense 3rd degree treatment, Naushad doesn't seem to be affected. When the policemen sent by Raghuram return to take back Naushad, he escapes captivity and this irks his ex boss to the core as his job is on the line. he sets a 24 hour deadline to bring back Naushad else he loses his job. So Dana sets out of his farm house after 13 Long years to track and bring Naushad back to custody. During his travel back to the city, he recalls his past with his love interest Stella who was raped and murdered by her cousin Robert for turning him down & how Dana landed in his farm house alone with Murugan and Subu.

Instead of going after Naushad, he tracks another young man named Abhishek who is the spoilt son of a lawyer. Dana kidnaps Abhishek to his farm house and interrogates him and knows that hes is the real killer of the girl who was in love with Naushad and that Naushad was framed in the murder.

So he locks him up in the underground cell.

Abhishek is not the only inmate there. Stellas cousin Robert is also locked up in the underground cell for the last 13 years. Robert explains the inhuman torture Dana is administering on him everyday and wishes he just dies to escape this hell. he also advises Abhishek to confess and go to prison instead of ending up like him here.

Abhishek decides to confess and does so infront of a camera. The court convicts him to life sentence. While coming out of the court, Abhisheks father notices that he has been beaten up and finds out that Dana is the reason for this by bribing one of the team members of Raghuram's team. He sets up a group of thugs to finish off Dana inside his farm house.

They join hands with the local thugs who were earlier thrashed by Dana and they assault him in the night.

Dana fights them off but a grievously injured Dana refuses to get medical help and dies in the farm house where Stella also lost her life 13 years ago.

A second hearing declares that the earlier video tape was forced out of Abhishek and acquits Abhishek due to lack of evidence. Following this, the Lawyer (father of accused)  is killed by Raghuram which is made to look like an accident and Abhishek ends up being the new inmate of the underground cell along with Robert.

The films ends with a group photo of the new members of the farm house, Naushad , Murugan , Subu , Danasekar & Stella (not visible to Murugan's eyes but visible to Naushad and Subu only ) posing for a picture, while Robert & Abhishek are locked up in underground cell.

Cast

Reception
The film released in theatres on 11 February 2022 and opened to mixed reviews. Suganth of The Times of India gave a rating of 2 out of 5 and called the film as an amateurish crime thriller.  Vignesh Madhu of Cinema Express rated the film with 2/5 stars, stating that, "The film could've been much better if only the makers had steered clear of the cliches and had bigger ambitions."

References

External links 
 

2022 action thriller films